The Valea Vinului is a right tributary of the river Vișeu in Romania. It discharges into the Vișeu in Vișeu de Mijloc.

References

Rivers of Romania
Rivers of Maramureș County